Marios Nicolaou (born 4 October 1983) is a retired Cypriot footballer and is currently an assistant coach for AC Omonoia.

External links
 

1983 births
Living people
Cypriot footballers
Association football midfielders
Aris Limassol FC players
AC Omonia players
Panionios F.C. players
AEL Limassol players
Levadiakos F.C. players
FC Inter Turku players
Veikkausliiga players
Super League Greece players
Cypriot First Division players
Cyprus international footballers
Sportspeople from Limassol